Westwood Halt railway station was a station in Stretton Westwood, Shropshire, England.
The station was opened on 7 December 1935 and closed to passengers in 1951.

References

Further reading

Disused railway stations in Shropshire
Railway stations in Great Britain opened in 1935
Railway stations in Great Britain closed in 1951
Former Great Western Railway stations